Ballybay railway station was on the Dundalk and Enniskillen Railway in Ireland.

It opened on 17 July 1854 and closed on 14 October 1957.

References

Disused railway stations in County Monaghan
Railway stations opened in 1854
Railway stations closed in 1957
1854 establishments in Ireland
1957 disestablishments in Ireland
Railway stations in the Republic of Ireland opened in the 19th century